Ben Woollacott is the name of a ship built by Remontowa to serve as part of the Woolwich Ferry service. The ship is named after a teenage deckhand who drowned in an accident while untying mooring ropes of the ferry Ernest Bevin in 2011. Ben came from a family of Thames watermen that had worked on the river for six generations.

The new ferry arrived in London on 15 November 2018. It has an automatic docking system to hold the ferry in place during loading. The vessel operates alongside sister ship Dame Vera Lynn. Both have suffered from numerous technical issues resulting in closures and service reductions, with Mayor of London Sadiq Khan apologising in November 2019 and stating the new ferries "aren't good enough".

References

Woolwich Ferry
Ships built in Gdańsk
2018 ships
Water transport in London